Mount Aix is a  mountain summit centrally located in the William O. Douglas Wilderness on land administered by the Wenatchee National Forest, and is the highest point in that wilderness area. It is also 24 miles east-southeast of Mount Rainier in Yakima County of Washington state. Mount Aix is situated east of the crest of the Cascade Range, southeast of Bumping Lake, north of Bismarck Peak, and northwest of Rimrock Lake. Its nearest higher peak is Tieton Peak in the Goat Rocks Wilderness,  to the south-southwest. Mount Aix is the highest peak in the entire region which is east of Mount Rainier National Park, north of Goat Rocks Wilderness, west of Yakima, and south of Mount Daniel (Alpine Lakes Wilderness), so it is quite prominent. Prior to 1897 (when Mount Aix was officially recognized by the USGS) the name was spelled as Mount Aiks on early survey maps and publications.

Climate
Mount Aix is located east of the Cascade crest. Most weather fronts originate in the Pacific Ocean, and travel northeast toward the Cascade Mountains. As fronts approach, they are forced upward by the peaks of the Cascade Range (Orographic lift), causing them to drop their moisture in the form of rain or snowfall onto the Cascades. As a result, the east side of the Cascades experiences less precipitation than the west side of the crest. During winter months, weather is usually cloudy, but, due to high pressure systems over the Pacific Ocean that intensify during summer months, there is often little or no cloud cover during the summer. Precipitation runoff from Mount Aix drains into tributaries of the Yakima River, thence into the Columbia River.

See also

List of mountain peaks of Washington (state)

References

External links
 Weather forecast: Mount Aix
 National Forest Service web site: William O Douglas Wilderness

 Washington Trails Association web site: Mount Aix Trail

Cascade Range
Mountains of Washington (state)
Mountains of Yakima County, Washington
North American 2000 m summits